Lloyd Woodard (born November 12, 1984) is an American professional mixed martial artist, currently competing in Titan FC's Lightweight division. A professional competitor since 2005, Woodard has also formerly competed for Bellator and King of the Cage.

Background
Woodard was born in Memphis, the third youngest in a family of nine children. At the age of two, his parents divorced resulting in him and his siblings moving in and out of relatives' homes in different regions of the country. While living in South Memphis, Woodard quickly learned to defend himself, being biracial, poor, and having a speech impediment until high school. Woodard also participated in wrestling for three years, excelling at the sport for Hellgate High School in Montana, where he graduated from. Woodard frequented a local boxing gym and also competed in a few amateur mixed martial arts fights before becoming a professional. Woodard stated in a Bellator interview that when he was growing up he went through a "bad kid" phase. His best friend at the time got into an altercation with a former University of Montana basketball player and he and the rest of his friends came to get Woodard, the "tough kid" on the block. They avenged their friend by going to the kid's house and beating him up badly. Woodward said this was the "breaking point" of his life. Although Woodard did not actually participate in the fight, he was convicted of felony burglary and violated his probation after getting in more altercations. After revoking his probation he ended up in a prison boot camp. He added, "I'm glad it happened because I could control my feelings a lot better and have more control of my life."

Mixed martial arts career

Early career
Woodard's first amateur MMA match was on March 19, 2005, and he quickly amassed a 4-1 record. Woodard made his professional MMA debut on October 11, 2008 and has made a name for himself by being a "scrappy fighter" with "unorthodox" submission skills. Before signing with Bellator, Woodard amassed a perfect 10-0 record.

Bellator
Lloyd Woodard is currently signed to Bellator, competing in their Lightweight division. Woodard made his Bellator debut at Bellator 36 on March 12, 2011, where he defeated Carey Vanier via TKO. Woodard lost for the first time in his career by decision to future Bellator Lightweight Champion Michael Chandler as a Lightweight semifinalist in the Bellator Season Tournament. In the quarter finals of Bellator's Season 6 Lightweight Tournament, Woodard faced Patricky Freire at Bellator 62. Woodard defeated Freire via submission in a back-and-forth fight. On April 20, 2012, Woodard faced Rick Hawn in the semifinals. Woodard lost the bout via knockout in the second round.

Woodard then participated in the Bellator Season 8 Lightweight Tournament Quarterfinals on January 31, 2013 at Bellator 87 against David Rickels. Woodard lost via unanimous decision.

Post-Bellator
Woodard faced Dave Courchaine at ICF: Intense Cage Fighting 8 on March 22, 2013. Woodard lost via split decision, his third loss in a row. Woodard rebounded with a first-round TKO victory against Jerome Jones at KOTC: Unleashed on February 13, 2014.

Woodard is currently signed to Titan Fighting Championship. He made his debut for the organization against Kurt Holobaugh in a Titan FC Featherweight title eliminator bout on August 22, 2014 at Titan FC 29. He lost via TKO in just 15 seconds of round one. Woodard was expected to face Danny White at GCMMA: Magic City Mayhem 4 on October 14, 2014. However, the bout was cancelled for unknown reasons.

Mixed martial arts record

|-
|Loss
|align=center|15–7
|Jake Roberts
|TKO (punches)
|Intense Fighting Championship 24
|
|align=center|1
|align=center|N/A
|Great Falls, Montana, United States
|Lightweight bout.
|-
|Win
|align=center|15–6
|Billy Martin
|Submission (rear-naked choke)
|Fusion Fight League: Redemption
|
|align=center|1
|align=center|3:06
|Billings, Montana, United States
|Catchweight (180 lbs) bout.
|-
|Loss
|align=center|14–6
|Joe Eichelberger
|KO (punches and elbows)
|Prize FC 11: Rock N' Rumble
|
|align=center|2
|align=center|1:06
|Williston, North Dakota, United States
|
|-
|Loss
|align=center|14–5
|Kurt Holobaugh
|TKO (punches)
|Titan FC 29
|
|align=center|1
|align=center|0:15
|Fayetteville, North Carolina, United States
|
|-
|Win
|align=center|14–4
| Jerome Jones
|TKO (punches)
|KOTC: Unleashed
|
|align=center|2
|align=center|2:28
|Worley, Idaho, United States
|
|-
|-
| Win
| align=center| 13-4
| Billy Martin
| N/A
| Fusion Fight League
| 
| align=center| N/A
| align=center| N/A
| Billings, Montana, United States
| 
|-
|Loss
|align=center|12–4
| Dave Courchaine
|Decision (split)
|ICF: Intense Cage Fighting 8
|
|align=center|3
|align=center|5:00
|Tampa, Florida, United States
|
|-
|Loss
|align=center|12–3
| David Rickels
|Decision (unanimous)
|Bellator 87
|
|align=center|3
|align=center|5:00
|Mount Pleasant, Michigan, United States
|
|-
|Loss
|align=center| 12–2
| Rick Hawn
|KO (punch)
|Bellator 66
|
|align=center|2
|align=center|0:10
|Cleveland, Ohio, United States
|
|-
|Win
|align=center| 12–1
| Patricky Freire
|Submission (kimura)
|Bellator 62
|
|align=center|2
|align=center|1:46
|Laredo, Texas, United States
|
|-
|Loss
|align=center| 11–1
| Michael Chandler
|Decision (unanimous)
|Bellator 40 
|
|align=center|3
|align=center|5:00
|Newkirk, Oklahoma, United States
|
|-
|Win
|align=center| 11–0
| Carey Vanier
|TKO (punches)
|Bellator 36
|
|align=center|2
|align=center|0:46
|Shreveport, Louisiana, United States
|
|-
|Win
|align=center| 10–0
| Alonzo Martinez
|Submission (rear-naked choke)
|Extreme Challenge: High Stakes
|
|align=center|1
|align=center|4:15
|Council Bluffs, Iowa, United States
|
|-
|Win
|align=center| 9–0
| Jesse Evans
|Submission (punches) 
|Pound'Em Productions: May 1 Mayhem
|
|align=center|1
|align=center|1:56
|Dickinson, North Dakota, United States
|
|-
|Win
|align=center| 8–0
| Mike Hanks
|TKO (punches) 
|CS: CageSport 9
|
|align=center|3
|align=center|1:54
|Tacoma, Washington, United States
|
|-
|Win
|align=center| 7–0
| Sterling Ford
|Submission (armbar) 
|CS: CageSport 8 
|
|align=center|3
|align=center|3:17
|Tacoma, Washington, United States
|
|-
|Win
|align=center|6–0
| Ryan Healy
|Decision (unanimous) 
|CS: CageSport 7
|
|align=center|3
|align=center|5:00
|Tacoma, Washington, United States
|
|-
|Win
|align=center|5–0
| Jake Oyler
|Decision (unanimous)
|FightForce: Missoula Mayhem 6
|
|align=center|3
|align=center|5:00
|Missoula, Montana, United States 
|
|-
|Win
|align=center|4–0
| Marques Daniels
|Submission (kimura)
|CS: CageSport 5
|
|align=center|1
|align=center|4:51
|Tacoma, Washington, United States
|
|-
|Win
|align=center|3–0
| Ryan Burwick
|TKO (punches)
|BB: Badlands Beatdown
|
|align=center|1
|align=center|3:08
|Dickinson, North Dakota, United States
|
|-
|Win
|align=center|2–0
| Carmen Cassella
|Submission (rear-naked choke)
|SF: Sport Fight 25: Wildcard
|
|align=center|1
|align=center|2:31
|Grand Ronde, Oregon, United States 
|
|-
|Win
|align=center|1–0
| Mel Ott
|Submission (rear-naked choke)
|EB: Beatdown at 4 Bears 3
|
|align=center|1
|align=center|1:30
|New Town, North Dakota, United States
|

Amateur mixed martial arts record

|-
|Win
|align=center| 4–1 
| Billy Hederson
|align=center|N/A
|Fightforce: Missoula Mayhem 3
|
|align=center|N/A
|align=center|N/A
|Missoula, Montana, United States
|
|-
|Win
|align=center| 3–1
| Jeremy Jones
|Submission (armbar)
|Full Contact Fighting Federation: Rumble at the Roseland 22
|
|align=center|1
|align=center|2:26
|Portland, Oregon, United States
|
|-
|Win
|align=center| 2–1
| Randy Bingham
|Submission (rear-naked choke)
|Montana Caged Combat
|
|align=center|1
|align=center|N/A
|Montana, United States
|
|-
|Loss
|align=center| 1–1
| Ed Nuno
|KO (punch)
|SF: Sport Fight 10: Mayhem
|
|align=center|1
|align=center|2:50
|Gresham, Oregon, United States
|
|-
|Win
|align=center| 1–0
| Loyal Newman
|Submission
|Full Contact Fighting Federation: Fight Night 7
|
|align=center|1
|align=center|3:18
|Klamath Falls, Oregon, United States
|

References

External links

American male mixed martial artists
Lightweight mixed martial artists
Mixed martial artists utilizing boxing
Mixed martial artists utilizing wrestling
1984 births
Living people